Acrocercops hexachorda is a moth of the family Gracillariidae, known from Karnataka, India. It was described by Edward Meyrick in 1914.

References

hexachorda
Moths of Asia
Moths described in 1914